Spas is a small village (or selo) in the Lviv Raion (or district), of Lviv Oblast (province), which is in the western part of Ukraine. It is also part of the Kamianka-Buzka urban hromada, one of the many hromadas (analogous to a municipality) of Ukraine. 
The population of the village is just about 276 people, and local government is administered by Streptivska village council.

Geography 
Spas is located along the western bank of the Bug River, which flows north/northwest into the Vistula River in Poland.

History and Attractions 
The official founding year of the village is considered to be 1493.  

During the Second Polish Republic, until 1934, the village was an independent commune in Kamionecki County of the Tarnopol Voivodeship. On August 1st, 1934, in connection with the administrative reforms, it was incorporated into the newly created rural collective commune of Żelechów Wielki (and partly into the commune of Kamionka Strumiłowa) in the same county and voivodeship. Po wojnie wieś weszła w struktury administracyjne Związku Radzieckiego. After the World War II, the village entered the administrative structures of the Soviet Union.

Until 18 July 2020, Spas belonged to Kamianka-Buzka Raion. However, the raion was abolished in July 2020 as part of a series of administrative reforms in Ukraine, which reduced the number of raions in Lviv Oblast down to seven. The area of Kamianka-Buzka Raion was also split between the Chervonohrad and Lviv Raions, with Spas being transferred to the Lviv Raion.

The village has an architectural monument of local importance to the Kamianka-Buzka Raion. The Church of the Transfiguration which was built in the early 20th century (2300M) in located in the village. There is also a public park to the village's immediate south.

References

External links 
 Kam'ianka-Buzkyi district, village Spas
 weather.in.ua
 DeCerkva, Спас, Преображення Господнього 1932

Literature 
 Історія міст і сіл УРСР : Львівська область, Стрептів. – К. : ГРУРЕ, 1968 р. Page 439 
Villages in Lviv Raion